Senator Morano may refer to:

Michael L. Morano (1915–2000), Connecticut State Senate
Sue Morano (born 1960), Ohio State Senate